The Alter Rhein (German for Old Rhine) is the old river bed of the Alpine Rhine in St. Gallen and Vorarlberg in the Alpine Rhine Valley, which was cut off when the Rhine was straightened during the 20th century.  These cut-off arms have become valuable recreational areas and a nature reserve.

In 1900, the short-cut at Fussach was completed, linking the natural course of the Rhine just upstream of Höchst and St. Margrethen directly to a new outflow into Lake Constance. The old river course downstream of this point, via Rheineck to Altenrhein on the shore of Lake Constance, became known as the Alter Rhein and continues to form the border between Austria and Switzerland. The arm is navigable from the lake to Rheineck, and is used by the Swiss shipping services on the lake to reach landing stages adjacent to Rheineck railway station.

In 1923, another short-cut was completed at Diepoldsau, creating another dead branch, also named Alter Rhein.

The area between the Old and New Rhine forms the nature reserve Rhine Delta (not to be confused with the Rhine Delta in the Netherlands).

External links 
 

Rhine
Rivers of Vorarlberg
Rivers of Switzerland
Tributaries of Lake Constance
Rivers of the canton of St. Gallen
Rivers of Austria
International rivers of Europe